WGV, or wgv, may refer to:

WGV, the National Rail code for Wargrave railway station in the county of Berkshire, UK
Whitbread Golding Variety, a variety of hop
World Golf Village, a golf resort in St. Johns County, Florida, United States

See also